The awit (Tagalog for "song") is a type of  Filipino poem, consisting of 12-syllable quatrains. It follows the pattern of rhyming stanzas established in the Philippine epic Pasyon. It is similar in form to the corrido.

One influential work in the awit form is Florante at Laura, an 1838 narrative poem by Francisco Balagtas.

See also
Dalit (poem)
Syllabic verse
Tanaga

References

Philippine poetry
Rhyme
Stanzaic form
Filipino poems